Bruce Weintraub (February 28, 1952 – December 14, 1985) was an American set decorator. He was nominated for an Academy Award in the category Best Art Direction for the film The Natural. He died from AIDS, aged 33.

Selected filmography
 The Rose (1979)
 Scarface (1983)
 The Natural (1984)
 Prizzi's Honor (1985)
 Pretty in Pink (1986)

References

External links

1952 births
1985 deaths
AIDS-related deaths in California
American set decorators